53P/Van Biesbroeck is a periodic comet 7 km in diameter.

This comet and 42P/Neujmin are fragments of a parent comet that split around March 1845. The orbit of 53P/Van Biesbroeck has a Jupiter Minimum orbit intersection distance (MOID) of only . The next perihelion passage is on Christmas Eve 24 December 2028. The comet is expected to brighten to about apparent magnitude 14.

References

External links
 Orbital simulation from JPL (Java) / Horizons Ephemeris
 53P at Kronk's Cometography

Periodic comets
0053
Comets in 2016
19540901